Victor Tagle (born 6 July 1940) is a Chilean alpine skier. He competed in two events at the 1960 Winter Olympics.

References

1940 births
Living people
Chilean male alpine skiers
Olympic alpine skiers of Chile
Alpine skiers at the 1960 Winter Olympics
Place of birth missing (living people)
20th-century Chilean people